Ray Voltz is a former U.S. soccer goalkeeper.  He seven seasons in the American Soccer League and earned three caps with the United States in 1937.

American Soccer League
Voltz played with Philadelphia Passon and Philadelphia Americans of the American Soccer League between 1936 and 1943.  He won the ASL championship in 1942 with the Americans.

National team
Voltz played three games with the national team in September 1937.  All three games were blowout losses to Mexico.

References

External links
 National Soccer Hall of Fame eligibility bio

American soccer players
Association football goalkeepers
United States men's international soccer players
American Soccer League (1933–1983) players
Philadelphia Nationals players
Uhrik Truckers players
Living people
Year of birth missing (living people)